Uttar Kusum is a census town and a gram panchayat within the jurisdiction of the Usthi police station in the Magrahat I CD block in the Diamond Harbour subdivision of the South 24 Parganas district in the Indian state of West Bengal.

Geography

Area overview
Diamond Harbour subdivision is a rural subdivision with patches of urbanization. Only 14.61% of the population lives in the urban areas and an overwhelming 85.39% lives in the rural areas. In the eastern portion of the subdivision (shown in the map alongside) there are 24 census towns. The entire district is situated in the Ganges Delta and the eastern part of the district is a flat plain area with small towns, many in clusters. Location of places in the larger map varies a little. It is an OpenStreetMap, while we are using coordinates as in Google Maps.

Note: The map alongside presents some of the notable locations in the subdivision. All places marked in the map are linked in the larger full screen map.

Location
Uttar Kusum is located at 

Usthi, Ghola Noapara, Barijpur and Uttar Kusum form a cluster of census towns in the Magrahat I CD block. Uttar Bishnupur, Kalikapota and Bamna are a little away from this cluster. This is as per the map of the Magrahat I CD block on page 445 in the District Census Handbook for the South 24 Parganas.

Demographics
According to the 2011 Census of India, Uttar Kusum had a total population of 10,716 of which 5,580 (52%) were males and 5,136 (48%) were females. Population below 6 years was 1,818. The total number of literates in Uttar Kusum was 5,849 (65.73% of the population over 6 years).

Infrastructure
According to the District Census Handbook 2011, Uttar Kusum covered an area of 3.3112 km2. Among the civic amenities, it had 814 domestic electric connections. Among the medical facilities it had 3 medicine shops.  Among the educational facilities it had were 3 primary schools, 1 secondary school, 1 senior secondary school.

Transport
Deula railway station is located nearby.

Education
Uttar Kusum High School is a Bengali-medium coeducational institution established in 1950. It has facilities for teaching from class VI to class XII.

Healthcare
Baneswarpur Rural Hospital, with 30 beds, at Baneswarpur, is the major government medical facility in the Magrahat I CD block.

References

Cities and towns in South 24 Parganas district